Strong in the Rain: Surviving Japan's Earthquake, Tsunami, and Fukushima Nuclear Disaster is a book by Lucy Birmingham and David McNeill published in 2012. The title is taken from the Japanese poem by Kenji Miyazawa about endurance.

References

Books about nuclear issues
Disaster books
Fukushima Daiichi nuclear disaster
Books about the 2011 Tōhoku earthquake and tsunami